This is a list of the heads of state of Ghana, from the independence of Ghana in 1957 to the present day.

From 1957 to 1960 the head of state under the Constitution of 1957 was the Queen of Ghana, Elizabeth II, who was also the Queen of the United Kingdom and the other Commonwealth realms. The monarch was represented in Ghana by a governor-general. Ghana became a republic within the Commonwealth under the Constitution of 1960 and the monarch and governor-general were replaced by an executive president.

Monarch (1957–1960)
The succession to the throne was the same as the succession to the British throne.

Governor-general

The governor-general was the representative of the monarch in Ghana and exercised most of the powers of the monarch. The governor-general was appointed for an indefinite term, serving at the pleasure of the monarch. Since Ghana was granted independence by the Ghana Independence Act 1957, rather than being first established as a semi-autonomous Dominion and later promoted to independence by the Statute of Westminster 1931, the governor-general was to be always appointed solely on the advice of the Cabinet of Ghana without the involvement of the British government, with the sole exception of Charles Arden-Clarke, the former colonial governor, who served as governor-general temporarily until he was replaced by William Hare. In the event of a vacancy the chief justice served as officer administering the government.

Status

First Republic (1960–1966)
Under the Constitution of 1960, the first constitution of the Republic of Ghana, the president replaced the monarch as executive head of state. The president was elected by Parliament for a 5-year term. In the event of a vacancy three members of the Cabinet served jointly as acting president.

Political parties

Symbols
 Constitutional referendum

Military rule (1966–1969)
Lieutenant-General Joseph Arthur Ankrah led a coup d'état which overthrew President Nkrumah and his government, all political parties and Parliament were also dissolved.

Other factions

Second Republic (1969–1972)

Other factions

Status

Military rule (1972–1979)
General Ignatius Kutu Acheampong led a coup d'état which overthrew President Akufo-Addo, Prime Minister Abrefa Busia and his government, all political parties, and Parliament were also dissolved.

Lieutenant General Fred Akuffo led a ball coup d'état which overthrew General Acheampong, then Flight Lieutenant Jerry Rawlings led a coup d'état which overthrown the Supreme Military Council.

 Other factions

Third Republic (1979–1981)
Under the Constitution of 1979 the president was head of both state and government. The president was directly elected and served a four-year term that expired at the next general election; a president might serve a maximum of two terms. In the event of a vacancy the vice-president served as acting president.

Political parties

Military rule (1981–1993)
Flight Lieutenant Jerry Rawlings led a coup d'état which overthrew President Limann and his government, all political parties and Parliament were also dissolved.

Other factions

Fourth Republic (1993–present)
Under the current Constitution the president is head of both state and government. The president is directly elected and serves a four-year term that expires at the next general election; a president may serve a maximum of two terms. In the event of a vacancy, the vice-president serves the remaining time as the president.

Political parties

Timeline since 1960

Demographics

Standards

References

External links
 World Statesmen – Ghana
 Rulers.org – Ghana

H

Ghana
Ghana